Dehgolan County (Kurdish: Dêgûlan) is in Kurdistan province, Iran. The capital of the county is the city of Dehgolan. At the 2006 census, the region's population (as Yeylan District of Ghorveh County) was 58,502 in 13,780 households. The following census in 2011 counted 62,844 people in 17,150 households, by which time the district had been separated from the county to form Dehgolan County. At the 2016 census, the county's population was 64,015 in 19,388 households.

Administrative divisions

The population history and structural changes of Dehgolan County's administrative divisions over three consecutive censuses are shown in the following table. The latest census shows two districts, five rural districts, and two cities.

References

 

Counties of Kurdistan Province